The Queen's Own Gurkha Logistic Regiment, also known as 10 The Queen's Own Gurkha Logistic Regiment or 10 QOGLR, is a regiment of the British Army's Royal Logistic Corps.

History
The regiment was created on 5 April 2001. It was formed as a merger of The Queen's Own Gurkha Transport Regiment, The Gurkha Transport Regiment and The Gurkha Army Service Corps which formed as component parts of The Brigade of Gurkhas on 1 July 1958. A post on the Gurkha Brigade website in August 2016 noted that a two new QOGLR squadrons will be formed in the future.

Structure:
36 Headquarters Squadron
1 Supply Squadron
28 Fuel and General Transport Squadron
15 Air Assault Support Squadron (under operational command of 13 Air Assault Support Regiment RLC)
94 Supply Squadron (under operational command of 9 Regiment RLC)

References

External links
 10 The Queen's Own Gurkha Logistic Regiment RLC 

Brigade of Gurkhas
Regiments of the Royal Logistic Corps